The Twenty-fifth Amendment may refer to the:

Twenty-fifth Amendment of the Constitution Bill 2002 – a failed proposal to amend the Constitution of Ireland
Twenty-fifth Amendment of the Constitution of India – dealing with public compensation for private property
Twenty-fifth Amendment to the Constitution of Pakistan
Twenty-fifth Amendment to the United States Constitution – which deals with succession to the U.S. presidency

See also